DXED-TV, channel 39, is a Philippine television station of Eagle Broadcasting Corporation (Net-25). The station's studios and transmitters is located at the Agdao, Davao City.

See also
DZEC-TV

Television channels and stations established in 1999
Television stations in Davao City
1999 establishments in the Philippines